Luolong is a town in Daozhen Gelao and Miao Autonomous County, Guizhou, China. There are four ethnic groups living in the town, including Han, Gelao, Miao, Tujia and Yi.

Administrative division
As of 2016, the town is divided into five villages and one community:
 Dingshiba Community
 Luolong
 Wuyi
 Sanyuan
 Yingzui
 Datang
 Longqiao

Geography

The Luolong River, also known as "Flower Stream", flows through the town.

Economy
The town's economy is based on nearby mineral resources and agricultural resources. The main mineral resources are iron and coal.

Tourist attractions
The Mopanshan Scenic Spot is a famous scenic spot.

Guanyin Rock is a Buddhist temple in the town, which was originally built in the Yuan dynasty (1271–1368).

Ox Horn Village is a tourism resort in the town.

References

Bibliography

Towns of Zunyi